XEQ is the callsign of the following broadcast stations in Mexico:

 XEQ-TV, channel 9
 XEQ-AM, 940 kHz
 XEQ-FM, 92.9 MHz

XEQ is also a keyword in IBM's Job Control Language (JCL).  This keyword is used to enable remote execution of code between systems.

XEQ is the IATA code of Tasiusaq Heliport (Kujalleq).